Joan of Arc is a 1922 cast of Paul Dubois's 1889 statue of Joan of Arc, located at Meridian Hill Park in Washington, D.C., United States of America. Joan of Arc  was originally surveyed as part of the Smithsonian's Save Outdoor Sculpture! survey in 1994.

Description

Joan of Arc is an equestrian statue, with Joan of Arc riding a trotting horse, resting upon a three-tiered granite base (H. 52 in. x W 11. ft.). Her body is twisted slightly, and her right arm is raised behind her. She is wearing a helmet with a raised visor and she looks skywards. In her left hand she holds the reins to her horse. The sword she originally held in her right hand was stolen in 1978, and not replaced until December 2011. The pedestal was designed by American artist H.L. Davis.

The front of the base has the inscription:

JEANNE D'ARC
LIBERATRICE

1412–1431

AUX FEMMES D'AMERIQUE
LES FEMMES DE FRANCE

A NEW YORK
LE 6 January 1922

Location

In 1921 the United States Commission of Fine Arts suggested that the sculpture be placed at the terrace of Meridian Hill Park.

Acquisition

The piece was first proposed in May 1916 by Mme Polifème to the Commission of Fine Arts in order to celebrate the friendship between France and the United States. During its creation, DuBois worked closely with the French Minister of Education and Fine Arts in producing a credible representation of the peasant girl.

The statue was completed in 1922 in Paris; the original (fr) was cast in three copies, currently located respectively in Reims (1890), Paris (1895) and Strasbourg (1897). The replica in Washington was donated by Le Lyceum Société des Femmes de France to the women of the United States of America.

Dedication

On 6 January 1923 when the piece was dedicated, President Harding and the French Ambassador were the guests of honor. Mrs. Harding and Mme Jusserand, who represented France, also attended.

Reception

According to the National Commission of Fine Art it was described, at the time, as being "regarded by artists as the finest equestrian statue of modern times." Henry Bacon wrote that "Dubois's statue of Jeanne D'Arc is one of the fine things of the world and no setting is too good for it."

Information

It is the only equestrian statue of a woman in Washington, D.C.

On the 500th anniversary of Joan's martyrdom, Paul Claudel, Ambassador of France, held a tribute to the Saint.

Condition
The sculpture was surveyed for condition in 1994 and was described as needing treatment.

See also
 Jeanne d'Arc (Frémiet)
 Joan of Arc (Dubois)

References

External links

Joan of Arc on dcMemorials 
Ghosts of DC Then and Now: Joan of Arc Statue in Meridian Hill Park – historical context and quotes from old Washington Post articles

1922 sculptures
Artworks in the collection of the National Park Service
Bronze sculptures in France
Bronze sculptures in Paris
Bronze sculptures in Washington, D.C.
Equestrian statues in Washington, D.C.
Meridian Hill/Malcolm X Park
Outdoor sculptures in Washington, D.C.
Sculptures of women in Washington, D.C.
Works about Joan of Arc
Statues of military officers
Cultural depictions of Joan of Arc